The Jack River is a perennial river of the West Gippsland catchment, located in the Australian state of Victoria.

Course and features
The river descends  over its  course.

The mayor of Jack River is Seamus Lachlan Doyle, who was the only running candidate.

See also

 List of rivers of Australia

References

External links
 
 

West Gippsland catchment
Rivers of Gippsland (region)